FC Obolon-2 Bucha is the second team of Ukrainian professional football club FC Obolon Kyiv based in Bucha.

It started in 2001 and played until February 2013, when it was discontinued for financial reasons. In 2019, the team was revived based on the Obolon-Brovar U-19 team and enrolled into Ukrainian Second League, playing home games at Yuvileynyi Stadium in Bucha.

Club history
FC Obolon Kyiv played in the Ukrainian Second League until it was promoted to the Ukrainian First League (Persha Liha) in 2001. The club entered its reserve team Obolon-2 into Ukrainian Second League (Druha Liha) for the following season. 

During the winter break of the 2008-09 season the 2nd team was withdrawn due to a lack of funds.

The team reformed as Obolon Kyiv Reserves and competed in the Ukrainian Premier Reserve League as the senior team was a member of the Ukrainian Premier League. When the senior team was relegated from the Premier League after the 2010–11 Ukrainian Premier League season, the club re-entered their reserve club into the Ukrainian Second League.

The senior club withdrew from the PFL in February 2013 due to a lack of funds.

League and cup history
{|class="wikitable"
|-bgcolor="#efefef"
! Season
! Div.
! Pos.
! Pl.
! W
! D
! L
! GS
! GA
! P
!DomesticCup
!colspan=2|Europe
!Notes
|-
|align=center colspan=14|Obolon-2
|-
|align=center|1998-99
|align=center|4th Gr "2"
|align=center|4
|align=center|14
|align=center|7
|align=center|1
|align=center|6
|align=center|20
|align=center|16
|align=center|22
|align=center|
|align=center|
|align=center|
|align=center bgcolor=lightgreen|Admitted
|-
|align=center|1999-2000
|align=center|3rd "B"
|align=center bgcolor=silver|2
|align=center|34
|align=center|21
|align=center|7
|align=center|6
|align=center|59
|align=center|24
|align=center|70
|align=center|
|align=center|
|align=center|
|align=center bgcolor=pink|Relegated
|-
|align=center colspan=14|2000–01 in city competitions
|-
|align=center|2001–02
|align=center|3rd "B"
|align=center|16
|align=center|34
|align=center|8
|align=center|11
|align=center|15
|align=center|34
|align=center|56
|align=center|35
|align=center|
|align=center|
|align=center|
|align=center|
|-
|align=center|2002–03
|align=center|3rd "B"
|align=center|11
|align=center|30
|align=center|10
|align=center|7
|align=center|13
|align=center|41
|align=center|45
|align=center|37
|align=center|
|align=center|
|align=center|
|align=center|
|-
|align=center|2003–04
|align=center|3rd "A"
|align=center|7
|align=center|30
|align=center|9
|align=center|12
|align=center|9
|align=center|25
|align=center|30
|align=center|39
|align=center|
|align=center|
|align=center|
|align=center|
|-
|align=center|2004–05
|align=center|3rd "A"
|align=center|14
|align=center|28
|align=center|4
|align=center|7
|align=center|17
|align=center|21
|align=center|49
|align=center|19
|align=center|
|align=center|
|align=center|
|align=center|
|-
|align=center|2005–06
|align=center|3rd "A"
|align=center|9
|align=center|28
|align=center|9
|align=center|8
|align=center|11
|align=center|31
|align=center|36
|align=center|35
|align=center|
|align=center|
|align=center|
|align=center|
|-
|align=center|2006–07
|align=center|3rd "A"
|align=center|12
|align=center|28
|align=center|5
|align=center|9
|align=center|14
|align=center|26
|align=center|45
|align=center|24
|align=center|
|align=center|
|align=center|
|align=center|
|-
|align=center|2007–08
|align=center|3rd "A"
|align=center|5/16
|align=center|30
|align=center|15
|align=center|6
|align=center|9
|align=center|50
|align=center|36
|align=center|51
|align=center|
|align=center|
|align=center|
|align=center|
|-
|align=center|2008–09
|align=center|3rd "A"
|align=center|16/17
|align=center|32
|align=center|5
|align=center|4
|align=center|23
|align=center|20
|align=center|30
|align=center|19
|align=center|
|align=center|
|align=center|
|align=center bgcolor=pink|Withdraw
|-
|align=center colspan=14|joined the UPL U-21 team competition
|-
|align=center|2012–13
|align=center|3rd "A"
|align=center|9/11
|align=center|20 	
|align=center|5 	
|align=center|3 	
|align=center|12 	
|align=center|21 	
|align=center|30 	
|align=center|18
|align=center|
|align=center|
|align=center|
|align=center bgcolor=Pink|Withdrew
|-
|align=center colspan=14|revived based on U-19 team, in 2017–2019 in Professional Football League of Ukraine Under 19
|-
|align=center|2019–20
|align=center|3rd "A"
|align=center|11/11
|align=center|20
|align=center|4
|align=center|4
|align=center|12
|align=center|18
|align=center|38
|align=center|16
|align=center|
|align=center|
|align=center|
|align=center|Avoided relegation
|}

Notes and references

See also
FC Obolon Kyiv

 
FC Obolon Kyiv
Football clubs in Kyiv
Obolon-2 Kyiv
Association football clubs established in 1998
1998 establishments in Ukraine
Sport in Bucha Raion